Pharis (1936–1957) was a French Thoroughbred racehorse who is "considered one of the greatest French-bred runners of the century," according to Thoroughbred Heritage. Named for the Spartan town of Pharis, he was owned and bred by leading French horseman, Marcel Boussac.

Breeding
Pharis was sired by Pharos who also sired "one of the greatest racehorses of the Twentieth Century," Nearco, from Carissima (three wins, second in French Oaks and dam of seven other winners) by Clarissimus.

Racing record
Conditioned by English trainer Albert Swann, Pharis was sent to the track at age three. Ridden by English jockey Charlie Elliott, Pharis won all three races entered including the then most prestigious race in France, the Grand Prix de Paris. His 1939 performances were such that a match race was being organized against Blue Peter, winner of England's 2,000 Guineas and Epsom Derby. However, on 3 September World War II broke out and Pharis would never race again.

Stud record
Pharis stood at stud at his owner's Haras de Fresnay-le-Buffard in Neuvy-au-Houlme in Orne where he notably sired Ardan in 1940 and whose 1944 performances would be the basis for Pharis earning that year's Leading sire in France title. However, following the German occupation of France the Nazis seized some of the best racehorses in the country including Pharis who was shipped to Germany to be used for breeding at the German National Stud. Following the end of the War in 1945, Pharis was recovered by his owner and returned to stud duty at Haras de Fresnay-le-Buffard.

Pharis was a very important and influential sire, producing at least 37 stakeswinners with 56 conditions race wins. In addition to Ardan, who won the 1944 Prix de l'Arc de Triomphe, other offspring of Pharis include Palencia, Scratch, Philius, Talma and Corejada.

Sons, Ardan, Priam (10 wins and sire) and Cortil were exported to the US; Scratch went to Argentina; Brazil imported six sons, at least three stallions went to South Africa, Talma went to Peru, Damtar was in Australia, Gabador in New Zealand and other sons went to England, Columbia, Italy and Germany.

Pharis died on 27 February 1957.

Pedigree

See also
 List of leading Thoroughbred racehorses

References

 Pharis at Pedigreepost.com
 Thoroughbred Heritage profile of Pharis

1936 racehorse births
1957 racehorse deaths
Racehorses bred in Orne
Racehorses trained in France
French Thoroughbred Classic Race winners
Champion Thoroughbred Sires of France
Undefeated racehorses
Thoroughbred family 20-a
Chefs-de-Race